Hat Chao Mai National Park is a protected area located in the Sikao and Kantang Districts of Trang Province, Thailand. It is a marine national park. Established in 1981, it is an IUCN Category II protected area with coral reefs, and an area measuring 144,292 rai ~ . The park has been designated as a Ramsar site since 2002.

See also
List of national parks of Thailand
List of Protected Areas Regional Offices of Thailand

References

National parks of Thailand
Protected areas established in 1981
IUCN Category II
1981 establishments in Thailand
Geography of Trang province
Tourist attractions in Trang province
Marine protected areas of Thailand
Ramsar sites in Thailand